The world’s first annual Sikh Awards ceremony was held on October 10, 2010 as a tribute to the skills, achievements, and successes of the Sikh community. The event was organized by The Sikh Directory.

The Sikh Directory
The Sikh Directory was published in 2006 and has since been updated and published annually. It is currently the world’s largest and most comprehensive Sikh business directory. It is an established and trusted brand which educates the next generation, stimulates community networking and connects buyers and sellers.

The Sikh Directory’s main objectives are to serve, connect and unite the Sikh community around the world, to help promote and magnify the competitiveness and breadth of Sikh businesses internationally.

Award Categories
Awards are given to individuals or organizations who have given an excellent service in business and to the Sikh community, especially Sikhs who have delivered their service in an exceptional and innovative way and can show examples of selfless voluntary service:

Sikhs in Business
For the organizations or individual that can best demonstrate how it has made exceptional financial returns, shown strong growth, innovative strategies and clear market leadership in its sector. This category also incorporates Business Man, Business Women and Entrepreneur awards.

Sikhs in Charity
For an individual, organization, or society which can best demonstrate that it has the community at heart and has had a positive impact whilst improving the health and wellbeing of society.

Sikhs in Education
For any Sikh educational establishment, teacher or individual that is taking a strategic approach to recognizing, educating and developing the talent and skills within the community.

Sikhs in Entertainment
This category recognizes directors, presenters, comedians, instrumentalists and musical artists etc... respected role models who promote the Sikh identity within the entertainment industry.

Sikhs in Media
For an individual or organization that has made a substantial positive impact within the media industry, including newspapers, websites, radio and television stations and all other media platforms.

Sikhs in Profession
Nominees in this category are employees whose contributions have made an exceptional difference on a local or global scale, in any field such as financial, medical, technology, government or legal.

Sikhs in Seva
This category recognizes an outstanding individual who has shown exceptional vision and contribution to society through means of Seva (Selfless Voluntary Service).

 Sikhs in wars

Foundation about sikh warriors related to their sacrifices and braveries in different wars with Muguls.

Sikhs in Sports
For an individual that has made a significant contribution to the sports industry on a regional, national or global scale whilst promoting there Sikh Identi

The Sikh Lifetime Achievement Award
For a Sikh who has made a significant contribution to Sikhism on a global scale, an individual who has demonstrated a positive impact on society whilst progressing Sikhism to higher levels.

The Sikh People's Choice Award
Chosen by the community through the online voting process, this category recognizes an individual who has had a positive impact on people's lives and has great admiration from others.

The Special Recognition Award
This highly respected honor is bestowed to a Sikh or non-Sikh that through their passion, dedication and commitment have made a significant contribution for the greater good of society.

Previous Award Winners

Sikh Award Winners 2010

 Sikhs in Business - Dr Kartar Lalvani - United Kingdom
 Sikhs in Business - Rabinder Buttar - United Kingdom
 Sikhs in Business - Mr Jasvinder Singh Sehmbi - United Kingdom
 Sikhs in Charity - United Sikhs - United Kingdom
 Sikhs in Education - Tejinder Virdee - United Kingdom
 Sikhs in Entertainment - Jazzy B - United Kingdom
 Sikhs in Media - The Sikh Times - United Kingdom
 Sikhs in Seva - Dr Manjit Kaur Birdi - United Kingdom
 Sikhs in Sports - Satnam Dhillon - United Kingdom
 The Sikh Lifetime Achievement Award - Fauja Singh - United Kingdom
 The Special Recognition Award - Bhai Sahib Dr Monhinder Singh Ji - United Kingdom

Sikh Award Winners 2011

 Sikhs in Business - Analjit Singh - India
 Sikhs in Business - Mrs Geeta Kaur Sidhu - United Kingdom
 Sikhs in Business - Mr Harvinder Singh - Malaysia
 Sikhs in Charity - Sikh Aid International - United Kingdom
 Sikhs in Education - Simon Singh - United Kingdom
 Sikhs in Entertainment - Gurmeet Kaur Sodhi - United States
 Sikhs in Media - Ravi Singh - United States
 Sikhs in Profession - Jodishwar Singh - Switzerland
 Sikhs in Seva - Kulvinder Singh Sihra - Kenya
 Sikhs in Sports - Harbhajan Singh - India
 The Sikh Lifetime Achievement Award - Prof Kartar Singh Ji - India
 The Sikh People's Choice Award - Raminder Singh Ranger - United Kingdom
 The Special Faith Award - Tariq Jahan - United Kingdom
 The Special Recognition Award - Stephen Grosz - United Kingdom

Sikh Award Winners 2012

 Sikhs in Business - Rajinder Singh Baryan - Kenya
 Sikhs in Business - Mrs Sukhinder Singh - United States
 Sikhs in Business - Mr Suneet Singh Tuli - India
 Sikhs in Charity - Cancer Research UK - United Kingdom
 Sikhs in Education - Dr Jagir Singh - India
 Sikhs in Entertainment - Gurpreet Singh - India
 Sikhs in Media - Guruka Singh - United States
 Sikhs in Profession - Gurmant Grewal - Canada
 Sikhs in Seva - Surender S Khandari - Dubai
 Sikhs in Sports - Rashpal Kaur - India
 The Sikh Lifetime Achievement Award - Bibi Inderjit Kaur Ji - India
 The Sikh People's Choice Award - Paul Uppal - United Kingdom
 The Special Recognition Award - Lakshmi Mittal - United Kingdom

Sikh Award Winners 2013

 Sikhs in Business - Harpal Singh Saggu - India
 Sikhs in Business - Ms Harpreet Kaur - India
 Sikhs in Business - Kamalpreet Singh Virdi - United States
 Sikhs in Charity - Sikh Welfare Association - Malaysia
 Sikhs in Education - Ms Tavneet Kaur Suri - Kenya
 Sikhs in Entertainment - Prabjot Kaur Randhawa - United States
 Sikhs in Media - Harbinder Singh Sewak - United States
 Sikhs in Profession - Harminder Dua - United Kingdom
 Sikhs in Seva - Dr Sarup Singh Alag - India
 Sikhs in Sports - Avtar Singh Sohal - Kenya
 The Sikh Lifetime Achievement Award - Jathedar Sant Baba Nihal Singh Ji - India
 The Sikh People's Choice Award - Jatinder Singh Durhailay - United Kingdom
 The Special Recognition Award - David Cameron - United Kingdom

Sikh Award Winners 2014

 Sikhs in Business - Malvinder Mohan Singh - India
 Sikhs in Business - Mrs Parminder Kaur - Netherlands
 Sikhs in Business - Suki Singh Ghuman - United Kingdom
 Sikhs in Charity - Sikh Helpline - United Kingdom
 Sikhs in Education - Ms Gursharan Kaur Kandra - Canada
 Sikhs in Entertainment - Bhai Baldeep Singh - India
 Sikhs in Media - Sangat TV - United Kingdom
 Sikhs in Profession - Amrit Singh Uppal - Singapore
 Sikhs in Seva - Swaran Singh Gharial - Kenya
 Sikhs in Sports - Navtej Singh - India
 The Sikh Lifetime Achievement Award - Tarlochan Singh - India
 The Sikh People's Choice Award - Pardeep Singh Bahra - United Kingdom

Sikh Award Winners 2015

 Sikhs in Business - Kuldip Singh Dhingra - India
 Sikhs in Business - Ms Indira Kaur Ahluwalia - United States
 Sikhs in Business - Ajinder Pal Singh - Botswana
 Sikhs in Charity - World Cancer Care - United Kingdom
 Sikhs in Education - Dr Raghbir Singh Bains - Canada
 Sikhs in Entertainment - Sardar Mohinder Singh Sarna - United States
 Sikhs in Media - Bal Samra - United Kingdom
 Sikhs in Profession - Karan Singh Bajwa - India
 Sikhs in Seva - Dr Parvinder Singh Pasricha - India
 Sikhs in Sports - Sundeep Singh Sandhu - United Kingdom
 The Sikh Lifetime Achievement Award - Bibi Parkash Kaur Ji - India
 The Sikh People's Choice Award - Kavanjit Singh Hayre - United Kingdom

Sikh Award Winners 2016

 Sikhs in Business - Bob Singh Dhillon - Canada
 Sikhs in Business - Ms Kiran Singh - United Kingdom
 Sikhs in Business - Supreet Singh Manchanda - United States
 Sikhs in Charity - Khalsa Aid - UK
 Sikhs in Education - Dr Birender Singh Mahon - United Kingdom
 Sikhs in Entertainment - Mrs Manika Kaur - Dubai
 Sikhs in Media - Akaal Television - United Kingdom
 Sikhs in Profession - Jaspal Singh Bindra - India
 Sikhs in Seva - Gurmeet Singh - India
 Sikhs in Sports - Ram Singh Nayyar - Canada
 The Sikh Lifetime Achievement Award - Sant Baba Iqbal Singh Ji - India
 The Sikh People's Choice Award - Natasha Mudhar - United Kingdom
 The Special Recognition Award - Mohammed bin Rashid Al Maktoum - Dubai

Sikh Award Winners 2017

 Sikhs in Business - Harmeek Singh - Dubai
 Sikhs in Business - Balvinder Kaur Takhar - Canada
 Sikhs in Business - Balbir Singh Kakar - Canada
 Sikhs in Charity - Pakistan Sikh Council - Pakistan
 Sikhs in Education - Panth Rattan Bhai Sahiba Bibi ji Inderjit Kaur - United States
 Sikhs in Entertainment - Gurinder Kaur Chadha - United Kingdom
 Sikhs in Profession - Jagmeet Singh Dhaliwal - Canada
 Sikhs in Seva - Navdeep Singh Bhatia - Canada
 Sikhs in Sports - Yuvraj Singh Dhesi - Canada
 The Sikh Lifetime Achievement Award - Sardarni Mann Kaur Ji - India
 The Sikh People's Choice Award - Jaspreet Singh Nyotta - United Kingdom
 The Special Recognition Award - Justin Trudeau - Canada

Sikh Award Winners 2018

 Sikhs in Business - Charanjit Singh Hayer - Kenya
 Sikhs in Business - Harjinder Kaur Talwar - India
 Sikhs in Business - Harcharan Singh Ranauta - India
 Sikhs in Charity - Sikh Womens Society - Kenya
 Sikhs in Education - Harpreet Singh Sareen - United States
 Sikhs in Entertainment - Satpal Prakash Sabherwal - India
 Sikhs in Media - Amardeep Singh Gill - United Kingdom
 Sikhs in Profession - Arvinder Singh Reel - Kenya
 Sikhs in Seva - Jasdip Singh Jassi - United States
 Sikhs in Sports - Jaspreet Singh Chatthe - Kenya
 The Sikh Lifetime Achievement Award - Hindpal Singh Jabbal - Kenya
 The Sikh People's Choice Award - Aman Singh Gulati - India
 The Special Recognition Award - Uhuru Kenyatta - Kenya

References

External links

Sikh culture
Sikhism in England